Stiven Shpendi (born 19 May 2003) is an Albanian professional footballer who plays as a forward for Italian club Cesena and the Albania national under-21 team.

Club career

Early career - Cesena
Stiven was born in Ancona, Italy along with his twin Cristian from Albanian parents originally from Pukë who were immigrants since 1997 and thus they hold dual citizenship. Their first team was Real Metauro from where they moved at Delfino Fano, then to San Marino academy until they went to Cesena. Twins in life twins also in the field of play, playing their first competitive season for Cesena under-17 squad coached by Filippo Masolini in Allievi Nazionali U17, where the attacking duo made each 16 appearances with Stiven scoring 11 goals and Cristian 14. Then playing for Cesena Primavera under coach Giovanni Ceccarelli in Campionato Primavera 3 2020–21 with "twin" appearances and goals 15 and 13 each, the duo helped the side to reach the final losing only to Arezzo Primavera. For the next season 2021–22, promoted already at Primavera 2 Stiven scored 23 goals in just 20 matches becoming league top-scorer and helped by 15 goals of Cristian in 17 matches, Cesena won the Championship gaining promotion now to Primavera 1 and also won the Primavera Supercup against Udinese Primavera beating them 4–1 with 2 goals from each twin. Meanwhile they were promoted also with in the first team in the 2021–22 Serie C where Stiven made his professional debut under coach William Viali on 10 October 2021 against Ancona-Matelica coming on as a substitute in the 86th minute in place of Mattia Bortolussi. He played a second game on 23 February 2022 against Imolese in the last 6 minutes of a goalless draw. Two days later the twins extended their contract with Cesena until 2025.

2022–23 season
Twins started a new season in Serie C on 4 September 2022 against Carrarese starting as the attacking duo under new coach Domenico Toscano, with Stiven himself scoring his first professional goal despite it didn't served as the opposite side overturned by scoring twice eventually winning the challenge 1–2. Then he was used mostly as a starter along King Udoh more often, scoring his second goal in the 6th game week on 2 October 2022 against Recanatese in the 16th minute from the penalty spot with his team Cesena winning 2–0. In the 8th game week on 16 October 2022 against Imolese Cesena won 4–0 with Shpendi playing the full 90-minutes along fellow striker Simone Corazza which scored a hat-trick of 3 goals and with Shpendi not participating in any of goals, made coach Toscano to relegate him on the bench, thus not playing in 5 consecutive game weeks becoming also fourth attacking choice losing competition also to Alexis Ferrante. He was returned to play as a substitute in the 14th game week against Ancona-Matelica on 20 November 2022 and then following a strain in the thigh and gluteal muscles of Udoh he played as a starter a week later against Olbia along Ferrante as Corazza was left on the bench but Shpendi suffered a knee injury which forced him to leave the play in the 68th minute and remaining out for 2 next weeks. Soon as he returned from the injury on 10 December 2022 he played as a substitute against Vis Pesaro replacing Corazza in the 66th minute and scoring immediately in action after a pass from Ferrante inside the are to give his side an away 1–2 win. Despite being decisive in this match he kept playing only as a substitute for another 3 next matches but however becoming first substitution choice thus overtaking King Udoh. Then he regained his starting spot to Alexis Ferrante to play along Simone Corazza and in his third match as a starter on 28 January 2023 he managed to score a brace against Pontedera assisted both by striker partner Corazza as Cesena took an away 0–3 victory to clinch the second spot.

International career
In November 2021, Shpendi was called up to the Albania national under-19 team by coach Armando Cungu to participate in the 2020 UEFA European Under-19 Championship qualification Group 7 where his side were shorted to play against France, Serbia and North Macedonia. He made his international debut in the first match on 10 November 2021 versus France playing in the starting line up and being substituted at half time exactly for his twin Cristian where his side got beaten 4–0. Then for the next two games he started from the bench to be acttivated only in the closing match against North Macedonia in the last 8 minutes with Albania U19 collecting a 3–1 victory to go on 4 points same as Serbia but failing to qualify due to the goal difference thus ranking in the 3rd place of the group.

He subsequently played for the Albania under-20 managed by coach Alban Bushi in September 2022 in Croatia against North Macedonia and Croatia where his side lost both matches with the same result 3–1 with Shpendi scoring the only goal against Croatia.

Coach Alban Bushi then gave the twins their debut with Albania under-21 on 16 November 2022 including in the starting line up.

Career statistics

Club

References

External links

2003 births
Living people
Sportspeople from Ancona
Albanian footballers
Association football forwards
Serie C players
Cesena F.C. players
Albania youth international footballers
Albania under-21 international footballers
Italian people of Albanian descent